We Nangshar Sutsen (? – ?) was an officer of Tibetan Empire.

According to Old Tibetan Chronicle, Nangshar was appointed as the Lönchen by the new crown king Trisong Detsen after his predecessor's execution in 755. He was later succeeded by Gos Trisang Yalag.

References
 Old Tibetan Chronicle, P.T. 1287

8th-century Tibetan people
People of the Tibetan Empire